Zinc finger protein 408 is a protein that in humans is encoded by the ZNF408 gene.

References

Further reading 

 
 
 

Proteins
Genes on human chromosome 11